Fudge-a-Mania is a 1990 children's novel by Judy Blume and the fourth entry in the Fudge series.

Plot
Peter Hatcher is horrified to learn of his family's plans to spend summer in a vacation home alongside the Tubmans, the family of his archrival, Sheila, located in Southwest Harbor, Maine. On the other hand, his younger brother, Fudge, who is five years old, anticipates the vacation because of his plans to marry her as a means of protection against the supposed "monsters" hiding beneath his bed, knowing that spouses often share one. This wish is pacified and dropped after a newfound friend named Mitzi Apfel provides him with a bottle containing her grandmother's "monster spray" during the vacation, but Peter is stunned to learn that she is the granddaughter of an idolized baseball player known as "Big Apfel". Also, along the way, he invites his best friend, Jimmy Fargo, on the vacation with him, a privilege gifted to compensate for having to spend it alongside Sheila, but is irritated when Jimmy starts to spend more time with her than with him out of sympathy for her own good friend's (Mouse, who was introduced in Otherwise Known as Sheila the Great) inability to join her on the vacation too, as she has the chicken pox. Along the way, Peter develops a huge infatuation on a teenage librarian named Isobel (Izzy for short) and Fudge is inspired to write a picture book after learning about Mitzi's own, "Tell Me a Mitzi". Jimmy's father, Frank, a celebrated painter, also receives inspiration after the Hatchers' baby daughter, Tootsie, toddles across a canvas with blue paint smeared on her feet, commencing a series of paintings appropriately entitled "Baby Feet". Sheila and Fudge don't get married, but Peter, Fudge, and Tootsie's widowed grandmother, Muriel, and Sheila's single grandfather, Buzzy Senior, get so, much to Peter and Sheila's dismay, who thereafter, pledged they would never stand each other, despite now being stepcousins.

Reception
In its review of the book, Kirkus Reviews wrote that "the story's a bit tame (no controversies here), but often amusingly true to life and with enough comic episodes to satisfy fans". Publishers Weekly called it a "fast-pitched, funny novel" and praised its "numerous diverting scenes".

Television adaptation
A television film based on the book was released on January 7, 1995, in the United States, starring Jake Richardson, Florence Henderson, Eve Plumb, Shirley Knight, Alex Karras, Luke Tarsitano, and Darren McGavin. It was directed by Bob Clark. It also inspired a half-hour Saturday morning TV series, Fudge.

References

External links
 

1990 American novels
American children's novels
Fudge series
Novels by Judy Blume
Novels set in Maine
Sequel novels
1990 children's books